The men's 100 metres at the 2014 IPC Athletics European Championships was held at the Swansea University Stadium from 18–23 August.

Medalists

Results

T11
Semifinals

Final

T12
Semifinals

Final

T13
Semifinals

Final

T34
Semifinals

Final

T35
Final

T36

T37
Final

T38
Final

T42
Final

T44
Final

T47
Final

T51
Final

T52
Final

T53

T54

See also
List of IPC world records in athletics

References

100 metres
100 metres at the World Para Athletics European Championships